Sueviota is a genus of fish in the family Gobiidae native to the Indian and Pacific Ocean.

Species
There are currently 7 recognized species in this genus:
 Sueviota aprica R. Winterbottom & Hoese, 1988 (Sunny dwarfgoby)
 Sueviota atrinasa R. Winterbottom & Hoese, 1988 (Black-nose dwarfgoby)
 Sueviota bryozophila G. R. Allen, Erdmann & Cahyani, 2016 (Bryozoan dwarfgoby) 
 Sueviota lachneri R. Winterbottom & Hoese, 1988 (Lachner's dwarfgoby)
 Sueviota larsonae R. Winterbottom & Hoese, 1988 (Larson's dwarfgoby)
 Sueviota pyrios D. W. Greenfield & J. E. Randall, 2017 (Fiery dwarfgoby) 
 Sueviota tubicola G. R. Allen & Erdmann, 2017 (Tube-worm dwarfgoby)

References

Gobiidae
Marine fish genera
Taxa named by Richard Winterbottom
Taxa named by Douglass F. Hoese